Birkner may refer to:

People
 Cristian Javier Simari Birkner (born 1980), skier from Argentina
 María Belén Simari Birkner (born 1982), female skier from Argentina
 Macarena Simari Birkner (born 1984), female skier from Argentina
 Wolfgang Birkner (1913–1945), Nazi war criminal
 Hans-Joachim Birkner (1921–1944), Luftwaffe fighter ace
 Nicola Birkner (born 1969), German sailor
 Jorge Birkner Ketelhohn (born 1990), skier from Monaco
 Stefan Birkner (born 1973), German politician

Places
 Birkner, Illinois